Barbara Czarniawska (also known as Barbara Czarniawska-Joerges; born in 1948 in Białystok, Poland) is an organization scholar.

At present, she is a Senior Professor of Management Studies at Gothenburg Research Institute, Gothenburg School of Business, Economics and Law, Sweden. Her research takes a constructionist perspective on organizing, most recently exploring the management of overflows, and integration processes. She is interested in complex organizations, institutionalism, action nets, organizational change, as well as methodology, especially in fieldwork techniques and in the application of narratology to organization studies.

Education
Czarniawska holds an MA in Social and Industrial Psychology from Warsaw University, 1970; Ph.D.in Economic Sciences from Warsaw School of Economics, 1976.

Affiliations
In the years 1984–1990 she worked at Stockholm School of Economics, first as an assistant professor, and later as an associate professor. She became full professor at Lund University in 1990, and moved to the University of Gothenburg in 1996. She was a visiting research fellow at the MIT Sloan School of Management, US; London School of Economics and Political Science; Wissenschaftszentrum Berlin; and scholar-in-residence at Rockefeller Foundation, Bellagio, Italy. She has been a Visiting Professor at Università di Roma 1, "La Sapienza", Università degli Studi di Napoli Federico II, Università di Bologna, Università di Trento, and Università di Venezia, Italy; University College Dublin, Ireland; Macquarie University and UTS Business School, Sydney, Australia; University of Edinburgh, and University of Glasgow, Scotland; Ben Gurion University, Beer Sheva, Israel; University of Leicester, and London School of Economics and Political Science, UK; University of Alberta, Edmonton, and University of Manitoba, Winnipeg, Canada; University of Innsbruck, Austria; Jagiellonian University, Krakow, Poland.Czarniawska is a member of the Royal Swedish Academy of Sciences since 2000, the Royal Swedish Academy of Engineering Sciences since 2001, the Royal Society of Art and Sciences in Gothenburg since 2002, and of the Finnish Society of Sciences and Letters since 2009. Since 2021 she is fellow of the British Academy.

Honors and awards
 2000 Lily and Sven Thuréus Technical-Economic Award “for internationally renowned research in organization theory"
 2003 Wihuri International Prize "in recognition of creative work that has specially furthered and developed the cultural and economic progress of mankind".
 2005 Oeconomiae doctor honoris causa, Stockholm School of Economics
 2006 Doctor Mercaturae Honoris Causa, Copenhagen Business School
 2006 Honorary Doctor of Science (Economics), Helsinki School of Economics[3]
 2011 Honorary Member of European Group for Organization Studies (EGOS)
 2013 Pro Studio et Scientia, School of Business, Economics and Law at the University of Gothenburg
 2017 1st EIASM Interdisciplinary Leader Award, 3 April 2017
 2017 Honorary Member of ASSIOA, Associazione Italiana di Organizzazione Aziendale
 2018 Doctor Mercaturae Honoris Causa, Det Samfundsvidenskabelige Fakultet, Aalborg Universitet
 2019 Honorary Member of puntOorg International Research Network
 2021 elected corresponding member of British Academy
 2021 NEON prize for an extraordinary journey of achievements in Management- and Organization (MOS) studies
 2022 Honorary Doctor of Turku School of Economics, University of Turku, Finland

Bibliography (in English) 
(1988) Ideological control in nonideological organizations, New York: Praeger.
(1989) Economic decline and organizational control, New York: Praeger
(1992) Exploring complex organizations: a cultural perspective, Newbury Park, CA: Sage.
(1966) & Sevón, Guje (eds) Translating organizational change, Berlin ; New York: Walter de Gruyter.
(1993/2006) The three-dimensional organization: A constructionist view, Lund: Studentlitteratur.
(1997) Narrating the organization: dramas of institutional identity, Chicago: University of Chicago Press.
(1998) Narrative approach in organization studies, Thousand Oaks, Calif.: Sage Publications.
(1999) Writing management: organization theory as a literary genre, Oxford; New York: Oxford University Press.
(1994)  & Guillet de Monthoux, Pierre (eds)  Good novels, better management: reading organizational realities, Chur: Harwood Academic Publishers.
(2000) A city reframed. Managing Warsaw in the 1990s, Reading, UK: Harwood Academic Publishers.
(2002) A tale of three cities, or the glocalization of city management, Oxford, UK: Oxford University Press.
(2002) & Höpfl, Heather (eds) Casting the other: the production and maintenance of inequalities in work organizations, London ; New York: Routledge.
(2004) Narratives in social science research, London: Sage
(2005) & Sevón, Guje (eds)  Global ideas: how ideas, objects and practices travel in a global economy, Malmö, Sweden: Liber & Copenhagen Business School Press.
(2005/2020) & Hernes, Tor (eds) ANT and organizing, Malmö, Sweden: Liber & Copenhagen Business School Press.
(2007)Shadowing and other techniques for doing fieldwork in modern societies, Malmö/Copenhagen/Oslo: Liber/CBS Press/Universitetsforlaget.
(2008/2014) A theory of organizing, Cheltenham, UK: Edward Elgar Publishing.
(2011) Cyberfactories: How news agencies produce news, Cheltenham, UK: Edward Elgar Publishing.
(2012) & Löfgren, Orvar Managing overflow in affluent societies, New York: Routledge
(2013) & Löfgren, Orvar Coping with excess: How organizations, communities and individuals manage overflow, Cheltenham: Edward Elgar
(2014) Social science research from field to desk. London: Sage.
(2019) & Löfgren, Orvar Overwhelmed by overflows? How people and organizations create and manage excess, Lund: Lund University Press.
(2020) & Solli, Rolf;Demediuk,Peter and Dennis Anderson Searching for the new welfare models, London: Palgrave Macmillan
(2021) & Joerges, Bernward  Robotization of work? Answers from popular culture, media and social sciences.Cheltenham: Edward Elgar.

See also
Organizational storytelling
Narrative inquiry

References

1948 births
Living people
People from Białystok
Polish academics
Polish business theorists
Polish sociologists
Polish women sociologists
Academic staff of the University of Gothenburg
Members of the Royal Swedish Academy of Sciences
Members of the Royal Swedish Academy of Engineering Sciences
MIT Sloan School of Management faculty
Polish women academics
Academic staff of Lund University